Hervé-Edgar Brunelle (13 June 1891 – 15 May 1950) was a Canadian politician and lawyer. He was elected to the House of Commons of Canada as a Member of the Liberal Party in the 1935 election to represent the riding of Champlain. He was re-elected in 1940 and 1945. He served on the House of Commons Special Committee on Reconstruction and Re-establishment and the Special Committee on Elections and Franchise Acts.

Brunelle was born in Batiscan, Quebec, Canada.

External links
 

1891 births
1950 deaths
Liberal Party of Canada MPs
Members of the House of Commons of Canada from Quebec
Place of death missing